{{DISPLAYTITLE:C18H26O3}}
The molecular formula C18H26O3 (molar mass: 290.40 g/mol) may refer to:

 Inocoterone acetate, nonsteroidal antiandrogen
 Octyl methoxycinnamate, a sunscreen ingredient
 Oxabolone, an anabolic steroid